Beetling is the pounding of linen or cotton fabric to give a flat, lustrous effect.

Process
Beetling was a textile finishing method of obtaining an aesthetic finish i.e. lustre in cotton or linen based fabrics, the cloth was exposed under the hammers. The hammers would repeatedly fall and rise on the subjected fabric, and the finish imparted a lustrous and absorbent effect that was ideal for linen dishcloths.

History
Within Ireland, beetling was first introduced by Hamilton Maxwell in 1725. Beetling is part of the finishing of the linen cloth. The hammering tightens the weave and gives the cloth a smooth feel. The process was gradually phased out, in lieu of calendering. A similarity is the compression; however, with calendering, the finish does not remain for the life of the cloth. This distinguishes it from beetling.

Beetling mill
William Clark and Sons based in Upperlands Northern Ireland are the last commercial beetling mill in the world and have been beetling on the same site since 1736.

See also 
 Fulling

References

Textiles
Textile techniques